Julie C. Dao is a Vietnamese-American fantasy author. She is best known for her debut novel, Forest of a Thousand Lanterns, an East Asian-inspired retelling of the Evil Queen legend from Snow White, and its sequel Kingdom of the Blazing Phoenix.

Early life and education 
Dao was born and grew up in upstate New York, the oldest child of Vietnamese immigrants. She studied pre-med biology in college, but decided not to go into the field.

Career 
In 2016, Dao received a three-book deal from Philomel Books, an imprint of Penguin Books.

Forest of a Thousand Lanterns, the first novel in the Rise of the Empress duology, was published in 2017. The young adult (YA) dark fairy tale retelling of Snow White explores the perspective of the Evil Queen and her dark path to the throne. The book received two starred reviews from Publishers Weekly, which called the book a "fascinating examination of destiny, responsibility, and how choices shape a person",  and Booklist, which named Forest of a Thousand Lanterns in its lists of Top 10 Diverse Fiction for Older and Middle Readers and Top 10 First Novels for Youth.  Rebecca Kuss, writing for Booklist, described Xifeng as an antiheroine whose "relentless pursuit of power is a welcome contrast to princesses of the past".  The New York Public Library recognized the book as one of its 2017 Best Books for Teens, and it was named a Junior Library Guild Selection.

Forest of a Thousand Lanterns has been optioned for television by NBC Universal.

In 2018, Dao published the companion novel to Forest of a Thousand Lanterns, titled Kingdom of the Blazing Phoenix. The second book in the Rise of the Empress duology continues the story from the perspective of an exiled princess determined to take back her rightful throne. The book received the honor of Junior Library Guild Selection and garnered a starred review from School Library Journal, which wrote that "the importance of storytelling and of family, biological and chosen, will resonate deeply with readers." Booklist called the characters "complex and intriguing; villains are admirably drawn so the reader sees their path," and Eric Smith of Paste also praised Dao's "beautiful writing and imaginative storytelling."

In 2019, Dao published her third novel, Song of the Crimson Flower, set in the same world as the Rise of the Empress duology, about a nobleman's daughter who must make amends to the would-be lover she cruelly rejected by freeing him of a witch's curse. The book was named a 2019 Junior Guild Library Selection, as well as one of Bank Street College of Education's Best Children's Books of the Year. Of the novel, Publishers Weekly said "Dao’s latest fuses beats of Cyrano de Bergerac with elements from her Rise of the Empress duology to create an East Asian–influenced tale of love, greed, politics, addiction, and found family," while School Library Journal predicted that "this will appeal to lovers of fairy-tale retellings and new fantasy worlds."

In October 2020, Dao will publish Broken Wish, the first in a quartet in which each book will be written by a different YA author and published by Disney Hyperion. The series will explore an intricate curse that ties characters together across time and continent. Dao's novel centers on Elva, a young woman in the village of Hanau, who hides her powers and visions from the world. Yet, when she accidentally witnesses a horrifying vision of the future, she decides she must do everything she can to prevent it.

Bibliography

Rise of the Empress Duology 

 Forest of a Thousand Lanterns (Philomel Books, 2017) 
 Kingdom of the Blazing Phoenix (Philomel Books, 2018)

Standalone 

 Song of the Crimson Flower (Philomel Books, 2019) 
 Team Chu and the Battle of Blackwood Arena (Farrar Straus Giroux Books for Young Readers, 2022) ISBN 9780374388751

The Mirror Series 

 Broken Wish (Disney Hyperion, 2020)

References 

Living people
American writers of Vietnamese descent
Women science fiction and fantasy writers
Writers from New York (state)
21st-century American women writers
1985 births